Banc of California is a bank serving the state of California with over 30 branches in Southern California, extending from San Diego to Santa Barbara. The bank is headquartered in Santa Ana, California in Orange County, with over 600 employees and 36 offices.

History

The Banc of California was founded in 1941 as the Rohr Employees Federal Credit Union, serving employees of the Rohr Aircraft plant in Chula Vista, California. The credit union was renamed the Pacific Trust Federal Credit Union in 1995, which itself was renamed the Pacific Trust Bank in 2000, becoming a mutually owned federal savings bank.

The Pacific Trust Bank was made into a subsidiary of First PacTrust Bancorp Inc. in 2002. First PacTrust Bancorp, Inc. and Beach Business Bank completed their merger in 2012. The company's two banking subsidiaries, Pacific Trust Bank and The Private Bank of California, were merged to form the Banc of California in 2013. The bank also hired former Los Angeles mayor Antonio Villaraigosa as a strategic advisor.

Banc of California bought 20 bank branches in Southern California from Popular, Inc., a Puerto Rico-based bank, for $5.4 million in 2014. The move doubled the number of branches the bank owned and brought its assets to $5 billion.

Jared Wolff took over as President and CEO of Banc of California in March 2019, succeeding Doug Bowers. Bowers had assumed the role in 2017, following founding CEO Steven Sugarman.

Banc of California announced the acquisition of Pacific Mercantile Bank in March 2021 in a transaction valued at $235 million.

Sponsorships

Since 2014, the bank has been the official bank of the USC Trojans, the athletic program of the University of Southern California.

In 2016, the Banc of California announced a partnership with Los Angeles FC, a Major League Soccer franchise, and a 15-year, $100 million deal with the club for the naming rights to their stadium Banc of California Stadium in Los Angeles, which opened in 2018. The deal was described as "a little out of the mold for a bank of our size" by then-CEO Steven Sugarman, with other observers noting that the bank was not well known nationally. The company paid $20 million for early termination of the naming rights deal in 2020, citing a shift in focus. Banc of California remains LAFC’s primary banking partner and continues to collaborate with the franchise on various initiatives.

References

External links
Official website

American companies established in 1941
Banks established in 1941
Banks based in California
Financial services companies based in California
Companies based in Irvine, California
Companies listed on the Nasdaq